Marmorofusus tuberosus is a species of sea snail, a marine gastropod mollusc in the family Fasciolariidae, the spindle snails, the tulip snails and their allies.

Description

Distribution
This marine species occurs off Okinawa Island.

References

 e Vermeij G.J. & Snyder M.A. (2018). Proposed genus-level classification of large species of Fusininae (Gastropoda, Fasciolariidae). Basteria. 82(4-6): 57-82

External links
  Reeve L.A. (1847-1848). Monograph of the genus Fusus. In: Conchologia Iconica, vol. 4, pls 1-21 and unpaginated text. L. Reeve & Co., London

tuberosus
Gastropods described in 1847